In organic chemistry, alpha-olefins (or α-olefins) are a family of organic compounds which are alkenes (also known as olefins) with a chemical formula , distinguished by having a double bond at the primary or alpha (α) position.  This location of a double bond enhances the reactivity of the compound and makes it useful for a number of applications.

Classification 
There are two types of alpha-olefins, branched and linear (or normal).  The chemical properties of branched alpha-olefins with a branch at either the second (vinylidene) or the third carbon number are significantly different from the properties of linear alpha-olefins and those with branches on the fourth carbon number and further from the start of the chain.

Examples of linear alpha-olefins are propene, 1-butene and 1-decene. An example of a branched alpha-olefin is isobutylene.

Production
A variety of methods are employed for production of alpha-olefins.  One class of methods starts with ethylene which is either dimerized or oligomerized. These conversions are respectively effected by the alphabutol process, giving 1-butene, and the Shell Higher Olefin Process which gives a range of alpha-olefins. The former is based on titanium-based catalysts, and the latter relies on nickel-based catalysts.  A whole other approach to alpha-olefins, especially long chain derivatives, involves cracking of waxes:
R-CH2-CH2-CH2-CH2-R'  ->  R-CH=CH2  +  CH2=CH-R'  +  H2 
In the Pacol process, linear alkanes are dehydrogenated over a platinum-based catalyst.

Applications
Alpha-olefins are valued building blocks for other industrial chemicals.

A major portion of medium or long chain derivatives are converted to detergents and plasticizers.  A common first step in making such products is hydroformylation followed by hydrogenation of the resulting aldehydes.  Long chain alpha-olefins are also oligomerized to give medium molecular weight oils that serve a lubricants.  Alkylation of benzene with alpha-olefins followed by ring-sulfonation gives linear alkylbenzene sulfonates (LABS) which are biodegradable detergents.  Competing often with these petroleum-derived products are derivatives of fatty acids, such as fatty alcohols and fatty amines.

Low molecular weight alpha-olefins (butenes, hexenes, etc) are used as comonomers, which are incorporated into polyethylene.  Some are subjected to olefin metathesis as a route to propylene.

See also
 Vinyl group

References

Alkenes